Mosel is a surname. It may refer to:

Arlene Mosel (1921–1996), American librarian and children's writer
Darrel Mosel, American politician
Hans von der Mosel (1898–1969), German noble and Nazi army general
Ignaz von Mosel (1772–1844), Austrian noble, court official, composer, musician, and music writer
Tad Mosel (1922–2008), American playwright and screenwriter
Ulrich Mosel (born 1943), German theoretical physicist and professor
Ulrike Mosel (born ?), German linguistics writer and professor

See also
Mosel (disambiguation)
Vanessa Benelli Mosell (born 1987), Italian pianist and conductor
Mostel (surname), a similarly spelled surname